Athletic Club "B", commonly known as Bilbao Athletic, is the reserve team of Athletic Club, a football club based in Bilbao, in the autonomous community of Basque Country in Spain. The team are playing in the Primera Federación – Group 2. Founded in 1964, the team holds home matches at the small stadium attached to the club's training facility at Lezama, holding 3,250 spectators or occasionally at San Mamés Stadium, with its 53,500-seat capacity, for important fixtures.

Reserve teams in Spain play in the same football pyramid as their senior team rather than a separate league. However, reserves cannot play in the same division as their senior team. Therefore, Bilbao Athletic are ineligible for promotion to La Liga. Reserve teams are also no longer permitted to enter the Copa del Rey. In addition, only under-23 players, or under-25 with a professional contract, can switch between senior and reserve teams. In recent years, most of Bilbao Athletic's players have been graduates from the club's youth setup ('cantera') via the feeder team, Basconia. As a result of Athletic's signing policy, only Basque players feature also for the reserve team.

History
The Bilbao Athletic name was first used in 1938 during the Spanish Civil War, when both La Liga and the Copa del Rey were suspended; most of the top Athletic players had joined the Euzkadi XI, a team put together at the suggestion of José Antonio Aguirre, the president of the Basque Country (and himself a former Athletic Bilbao footballer). Euzkadi went on tour to raise funds for the Basque cause, and also played in the Mexican domestic league. However, at home the Campeonato de Vizcaya had resumed in 1938. With their best players abroad with Euzkadi, Athletic could only field weakened sides and, to avoid possible shameful results damaging the club's reputation, chose to enter under the name Bilbao Athletic (the name was derived from the two clubs that merged in 1903 to become Athletic Bilbao – Bilbao Football Club and Athletic Club). Despite the low expectations, they still won the championship and entered the 1939 Copa del Generalísimo.

The name was revived in 1964, when Athletic Bilbao decided to establish a reserve team with Agustín Gaínza as coach. The new Bilbao Athletic initially played in local regional leagues before winning promotion to Tercera División in 1966, under Rafa Iriondo; in 1969 they first reached Segunda División.

In 1983–84, with José Ángel Iribar as coach, and an emerging Julio Salinas as striker, the reserves finished in second place, only trailing Castilla CF; both teams were ineligible for promotion, and Salinas won the Pichichi.

Bilbao Athletic dropped back down to the third level in 1996, but the main squad continued to be nurtured with several players who had spells with the reserves.

After 19 seasons in the Segunda División B, Bilbao Athletic returned to the second tier after defeating Cádiz CF, 3–1 on aggregate, in the promotion playoffs. However, in their campaign in the Segunda they were reliant on the same group, a core squad of 20-year-olds who had never played at such a high level before, and despite battling performances in most of their games, a pattern of narrow defeats led to the team finishing bottom and being relegated back down at the first attempt. Somewhat ironically, the promoted teams that season were CD Leganés whose squad included three players on loan from Athletic who would have been eligible to play for Bilbao Athletic that season, as well as the parent club's local rivals Alavés and Osasuna.

The team came close to another promotion in 2020–21, losing to Burgos after extra time in the final round of the promotion play-offs (they had lost in the opening round in 2018 and 2020).

Premier League International Cup
Athletic have competed in the Premier League International Cup (an Under-23 tournament, all matches played in England), with most of the players selected for their squad drawn from Bilbao Athletic plus some younger additions from Basconia and the Juvenil squads (the rules permit the use of a limited number of overage players, but Athletic do not use them). In 2014–15, 2015–16 and 2016–17 the club qualified from their group but were eliminated in the quarter-finals, while in the 2017–18, 2018–19 and 2019–20 editions, they bowed out at the group stage.

Background
As farm team:
Club Atlético de Bilbao Amateur (1964–66)
Bilbao Atlético Club (1966–72)
Bilbao Athletic Club (1972–91)
As reserve team:
Athletic Club B (1991–2006)
Bilbao Athletic (2006–)

Season to season
As a farm team

As a reserve team

14 seasons in Segunda División
2 seasons in Primera Federación
31 seasons in Segunda División B
10 seasons in Tercera División
2 seasons in Categorías Regionales

Current squad
.

Reserve team

Out on loan

Honours

Segunda División B:  1982–83, 1988–89
Tercera División:  1966–67, 1968–69
Biscay Championship: 1938–39

Notes

Stadium

For big matches, they use San Mamés, the first team stadium.

Selected coaches

 Javier Clemente
 Agustín Gaínza
 José Ángel Iribar
 Rafa Iriondo
 Ignacio Izagirre (284 matches)
 Iñaki Sáez (290 matches, record)
 José Ángel Ziganda (242 matches)

Notable players

Note: This list includes players that have appeared in at least 100 top league games and/or have reached international status.

  Justo Ruiz
  Jonás Ramalho
   Iñaki Williams
 Aritz Aduriz
 Borja Agirretxu
 Ustaritz Aldekoaotalora
 Edu Alonso
 Joseba Aguirre
 José Ramón Alexanko
 Rafael Alkorta
 Yeray Álvarez
 Genar Andrinúa
 Anaitz Arbilla
 Kepa Arrizabalaga
 Daniel Astrain
 Dani Aranzubia
 Estanislao Argote
 Andoni Ayarza
 Enrique Ayúcar
 Mikel Balenziaga
 Ibon Begoña
 Javier Bellido
 Mario Bermejo
 Rubén Bilbao
 Jon Pérez Bolo
 Unai Bustinza
 Andoni Cedrún
 Sergio Corino
 Miguel de Andrés
 Óscar de Marcos
 Asier del Horno
 Juan Antonio Deusto
 Juan José Elgezabal 
 Xabier Eskurza
 Imanol Etxeberria
 Beñat Etxebarria
 Xabier Etxeita
 Patxi Ferreira
 Luis Fernando 
 Luis de la Fuente
 José Manuel Galdames
 José Ramón Gallego
 Carlos García
 Ander Garitano
 Andoni Goikoetxea
 Ibai Gómez
 Pizo Gómez
 Fernando Javier Gómez
 Javi González
 Javi Gracia
 Endika Guarrotxena
 Julen Guerrero
 Felipe Guréndez
 Carlos Gurpegui
 Gorka Iraizoz
 Andoni Iraola
 Ander Iturraspe
 Aitor Karanka
 Iñaki Lafuente
 Andoni Lakabeg
  Aymeric Laporte
 Aitor Larrazábal
 Iñigo Lekue
 Ángel Lekumberri
 Iñigo Liceranzu
 Iñigo Lizarralde
 Fernando Llorente
 Unai López
 Alberto Martín 
 Ricardo Mendiguren
 Jesús Merino
 Iker Muniain
 Ander Murillo
 Andoni Murúa
 Miguel Navarro
 Txema Noriega
 Unai Núñez
 José María Núñez
 José Ignacio Oñaederra
 Luis Prieto
 Carlos Purroy 
 Álex Remiro
 José Ángel Rojo
 Txetxu Rojo
 Dani Ruiz-Bazán
 Carlos Ruiz
 Julio Salinas
 Patxi Salinas
 Manuel Sarabia
 Félix Sarriugarte
 Miguel Sola
 Markel Susaeta
 Unai Simón
 Óscar Tabuenka
 Santiago Urquiaga
 Josu Urrutia
 Ismael Urtubi
 Juanjo Valencia
 Óscar Vales
 Mikel Vesga
 Juan Carlos Vidal
 Nico Williams
 Francisco Yeste
 Félix Zubiaga
 Andoni Zubizarreta
 Luís María Zugazaga 
 Fernando Amorebieta

See also
CD Basconia (Athletic Bilbao's feeder club)

References

External links
Team history at Athletic Bilbao's official website
Futbolme team profile 
 La Cantera De Lezama – Unofficial website focusing on Athletic’s youth teams 

Athletic Bilbao
Football clubs in the Basque Country (autonomous community)
Spanish reserve football teams
Association football clubs established in 1964
1964 establishments in Spain
Premier League International Cup
Segunda División clubs
Primera Federación clubs